Ochodza  is a village in the administrative district of Gmina Trzemeszno, within Gniezno County, Greater Poland Voivodeship, in west-central Poland It lies approximately  north-west of Trzemeszno,  north-east of Gniezno, and  north-east of the regional capital Poznań.

References

Ochodza